Araeopteron griseata is a species of moth of the family Erebidae. It was described by George Hampson in 1907. It is found in Sri Lanka, India, Fiji, Indonesia, Sierra Leone and South Africa.

References

Moths described in 1907
Boletobiinae